Malus doumeri is a species in the genus Malus in the family Rosaceae, that resembles Docynia and has been placed in that genus in the past. It is native to temperate and tropical Asia. The fruit is edible.

It is also called with the common name Taiwan crabapple, and is arbituted for medicinal properties of skin care.

References

doumeri
Crabapples
Flora of temperate Asia